Jo Ann Davidson (born September 28, 1927) is an American politician of the Republican Party. A member of the Ohio House of Representatives from 1981 to 2000, she was Speaker of the Ohio House of Representatives from 1995–2000. She is also the national committeewoman for Republican Party for Ohio.

Davidson was appointed to the Ohio Casino Control Commission by Governor John R. Kasich on February 23, 2011. Her term of office ended on February 21, 2018.

Davidson was first elected to the Ohio House of Representatives in 1981. Her legislative district consisted of a portion of Franklin County, Ohio. In 1995, she became the first woman elected as Speaker. She was succeeded by Larry L. Flowers in 2001 and became interim director of the Ohio Department of Job and Family Services that year.

In 2016, the Capitol Theatre in Columbus, Ohio was renamed in her honor.  The theatre sits across the street from the Ohio Statehouse.

See also
List of female speakers of legislatures in the United States

References

External links
 Ohiohistorycentral.org
 "Kasich appoints members of Ohio Casino Control Commission, February 23, 2011
Profile on the Ohio Ladies Gallery website

1927 births
Members of American gaming commissions
Living people
Republican Party members of the Ohio House of Representatives
Republican National Committee members
Speakers of the Ohio House of Representatives
Women state legislators in Ohio
20th-century American politicians
20th-century American women politicians
People from Findlay, Ohio
21st-century American women